The Men's Malaysian Open Squash Championships 2012 is the men's edition of the 2012 Malaysian Open Squash Championships, which is a tournament of the PSA World Tour event International (Prize money : 50 000 $). The event took place in Kuala Lumpur in Malaysia from the 12 September to the 15 September. Tarek Momen won his first Malaysian Open trophy, beating Mohamed El Shorbagy in the final.

Prize money and ranking points
For 2012, the prize purse was $ 50,000. The prize money and points breakdown is as follows:

Seeds

Draw and results

See also
PSA World Tour 2012
Malaysian Open Squash Championships
Women's Malaysian Open Squash Championships 2012

References

External links
PSA Malaysian Open Squash Championships 2012 website
Malaysian Open Squash Championships 2012 Squashsite website

Squash tournaments in Malaysia
Malaysian Open Squash Championships
2012 in Malaysian sport